In central Manitoba lies the Flin Flon greenstone belt, which is one of the largest Paleoproterozoic volcanic-hosted massive sulphide districts in the world, containing 27 copper-zinc-(gold) deposits from which more than 183 million tonnes of sulphide have been mined.

Ashville Formation

The Ashville Formation is a geological formation in Saskatchewan and Manitoba whose strata date back to the Late Cretaceous. Dinosaur remains are among the fossils that have been recovered from the formation.

It is geochronologically equivalent to the Lower Colorado Group and the Viking Formation in central Alberta.

References